Lawrence Snyder (August 9, 1896 – September 25, 1982) was an American track and field athlete, coach, and military veteran.  He served as the track and field coach at Ohio State University from 1932 to 1965.

Larry Snyder was portrayed by Jason Sudeikis in the 2016 biopic, Race, about Olympic athlete Jesse Owens.

Military career
Snyder was a pilot instructor in World War I and also served in the U.S. Navy in World War II.

Coaching career
Snyder was due to participate in the 1924 Summer Olympics in Paris as a runner, but was injured in an airplane crash a few weeks before he was due to set out. This ended his hope of an athletic career, leaving him only the option of being a coach and training others.

The most heralded athlete coached by Larry Snyder was Jesse Owens, and Coach Snyder helped improve Jesse's techniques and performance.  Other successful athletes coached by Snyder were Dave Albritton, Glenn Davis and "Marvelous Mal" Whitfield.  All told, Snyder's OSU athletes set 14 world records, won 52 All-Americans certificates and eight Olympic gold medals. Snyder was inducted into Ohio State Varsity O Hall of Fame in 1977.

Olympic coaching career
Snyder was the U.S. track and field assistant coach in 1952 (Helsinki) and the head coach in 1960 (Rome).  Under his coaching, the 1952 USA team won 40 medals in Helsinki and the 1960 team won 32 medals in Rome.

References

1896 births
1982 deaths
American male hurdlers
American track and field coaches
Ohio State Buckeyes track and field coaches
Ohio State Buckeyes men's track and field athletes
Sportspeople from Canton, Ohio